The Monroe H. Martin Prize recognizes an outstanding paper in applied mathematics, including numerical analysis, by a young researcher not more than 35 years old and a resident of North America. First awarded in 1975, it is given every 5 years by the Institute for Physical Science and Technology, University of Maryland, College Park. The prize commemorates the achievements of Monroe H. Martin, former director of the Institute for Fluid Dynamics and Applied Mathematics and chair of the Mathematics Department at the University of Maryland. The prize carries a monetary award plus travel expenses; recipient presents his or her work at the Monroe H. Martin lecture at the University of Maryland.

Recipients 
The recipients of the Monroe H. Martin Prize are: 

 1975:  Neil E. Berger
 1980:  Marshall Slemrod
 1985: Jonathan Goodman
 1990: Marek Rychlik
 1995: Andrew M. Stuart
 1995: Zhihong Xia
 2000: Robert J. McCann
 2000: Yury Grabovsky
 2005: C.Sinan Gunturk
 2005: Jared Tanner
 2010: Adam Oberman
 2010: Joel A. Tropp

See also

 List of mathematics awards

References 

Mathematics awards